Cremnophila may refer to:
 Cremnophila (moth), a genus of moths in the family Pyralidae
 Cremnophila (plant), a genus of plants in the family Crassulaceae